Pechki may refer to:

Pechki, Oryol Oblast, a village (selo) in Oryol Oblast, Russia
Pechki, Pskov Oblast, a village in Pskov Oblast, Russia